Slezské Pavlovice (until 1947 Německé Pavlovice) is a municipality and village in Bruntál District in the Moravian-Silesian Region of the Czech Republic. It has about 200 inhabitants.

Geography
Slezské Pavlovice is situated in the northernmost part of the Osoblažsko microregion, on the border of with Poland. It lies in the Opava Hilly Land.

Slezské Pavlovice is located on the left bank of the Prudnik River. The Pavlovický Stream, a tributary of the Prudnik, flows through the village. Pavlovický Pond II, supplied by the stream, is part of the Osoblažský výběžek Nature Monument. The second small-scaled protected area is the Džungle Nature Reserve.

History

According to archeological findings, the original settlement of the area dates back to the Early Bronze Age. The first written mention of Pavlovice is in a deed of the bishop Bruno von Schauenburg from 1267.

The village was settled by Germans and until 1947, it was called Německé Pavlovice (Deutsch Paulowitz, i.e. "German Pavlovice"). After the World War II, the German population was expelled and the municipality was renamed.

Sights
The landmark of the village is the Church of Saint Andrew. It is a neo-Gothic building, built on the initiative of the Archbishop of Olomouc Friedrich Egon von Fürstenberg in 1869–1871.

A significant monument is the Slezské Pavlovice Castle. The fortress, which probably existed since the 14th century, was rebuilt into a Renaissance castle during the rule of the Sup of Fulštejn family in 1557, and then into a Baroque castle during the rule of the Mattencloit family in 1776. During the interwar period the castle was given to the Just family who owned it until 1945. After the war it became the state property. Today it is owned by a private owner.

Other sights in the municipality include a baroque statue of John of Nepomuk from the second half of the 18th century, and monument to the victims of the World War I.

References

External links

Villages in Bruntál District